Jin Hao (born 6 February 1979) is a Chinese former swimmer who competed in the 2000 Summer Olympics.

References

1979 births
Living people
Chinese male medley swimmers
Chinese male freestyle swimmers
Olympic swimmers of China
Swimmers at the 2000 Summer Olympics
Asian Games medalists in swimming
Swimmers at the 2002 Asian Games
Asian Games bronze medalists for China
Medalists at the 2002 Asian Games
21st-century Chinese people